Mevo'ot HaHermon Regional Council (Mo'atza Azorit Mevo'ot HaHermon) is a Regional Council in the Northern District of Israel. It encompasses 13 moshavim and community settlements, from the northern shore of the Sea of Galilee, to the Lebanese border and Mount Hermon. Its offices are located in Merkaz Kach, between roads 90 and 899.

Settlements

Moshavim

Amnun
Beit Hillel
Dishon
Elifelet
Kahal
Margaliot
Mishmar HaYarden
Ramot Naftali
Sde Eliezer
She'ar Yashuv
Yuval

Community settlements

Karkom
Korazim

Albanian earthquake relief assistance

On 26 November 2019, an earthquake struck the Durrës region of Albania, killing 51 people, injuring 3,000 others, and damaging 11,000 buildings. Israel sent a rescue and service team from the regional council of Mevo'ot HaHermon and Home Front Command troops to Albania to search through the rubble for survivors and rescue them, assess whether buildings were structurally sound, and provide Albanians who had been evacuated from their homes with waterproof tents to shelter them.

References

External links
 Official website (in Hebrew)

 
Regional councils in Northern District (Israel)